Alison Platt (born February 1962) is a British businesswoman. She was the chief executive officer (CEO) of Countrywide, the UK's largest estate agency group from 2014 to January 2018, resigning after overseeing a 90% fall in the company's share price and a second profit warning in three months.

Alison Elizabeth Platt was born in February 1962.

Platt joined British Airways as a management trainee straight from school, turning down the offer of a university place and worked there for 13 years. She is a non-executive director of Tesco.

In 2014, Platt was appointed CEO of Countrywide, the UK's largest estate agency group.

She resigned in January 2018, receiving her final years' salary in one lump sum, after Countrywide issued its second profit warning in three months, and its shares fell to an all-time low. Her role was taken over by the chairman Peter Long, while a successor is sought. During her time at Countrywide the share price fell from roughly 300 pence per share, to around 6 pence. She had claimed in her interview process that she would oversee a profits increase by a scale of 5; that did not happen.

References

Living people
1962 births
People from Teddington
British women in business
British corporate directors
British chief executives